Call of the Wild is the first studio album by Danish rock band D-A-D, at the time known as Disneyland After Dark. The album was released on 4 February 1986 by Mega Records.
The album has been received with mixed reviews. The genre of the album is more country than the hard rock of their later albums. The two tracks "Marlboro Man" and "It's After Dark" are sometimes still played at their concerts, and can also be found on some of their live albums. The album was produced by Norwegian-born Frank Marstokk, a musician and producer who was A&R at Mega Records.

Track listing

Personnel
Adapted from the album's liner notes.
Disneyland After Dark
Jesper Binzer – vocals, guitar, banjo
Stig Pedersen – vocals, bass
Jacob Binzer – guitar, keyboards
Peter Lundholm – drums, percussion
Additional musicians
The Texas Horns – horns on "Jonnie"
The Rock River Gals – backing vocals on "Rock River" 
Technical
Frank Marstokk – producer, arrangements
Jørgen Bo – engineer
Mogens Bjergby – engineer
Nis Bøgvad – engineer 
Disneyland After Dark – arrangements, cover concept, inner sleeve  
Ida Balslev Olesen – cover design
Jan Harritshøj – photography (front cover)
Robin Skjoldborg – photography (back cover, inner sleeve) 
Torleif Hoppe – photography (inner sleeve)  
Finn Olufsen – photography (inner sleeve)

References

External links
 This album on D-A-D's official homepage

1986 debut albums
D.A.D. (band) albums